Giacinto Fabbroni (active mid-18th century) was an Italian painter, born in Prato, but mainly active in Impruneta and Florence. He painted an altarpiece of La Concezione for one of the chapels the church of San Gaetano in Florence.

References

18th-century Italian painters
Italian male painters
Italian Baroque painters
Year of death unknown
Year of birth unknown
18th-century Italian male artists